Kaede Hagitani (萩谷楓, born 10 October 2000) is a Japanese athlete. She competed in the women's 5000 metres event at the 2020 Summer Olympics.

References

External links
 

2000 births
Living people
Japanese female long-distance runners
Athletes (track and field) at the 2020 Summer Olympics
Olympic athletes of Japan
Place of birth missing (living people)
21st-century Japanese women